The English Patient is the original soundtrack, on the Fantasy Records label, of the 1996 Academy Award- and Golden Globe-winning film The English Patient starring Ralph Fiennes, Kristin Scott Thomas, Willem Dafoe, Juliette Binoche (who won the Academy Award for Best Supporting Actress for her role as "Hana" in this film) and Colin Firth. The original score and songs were composed by Gabriel Yared.

The album won the four major soundtrack awards: the Academy Award (Best Dramatic Score), the Golden Globe (Best Original Score), the BAFTA Award (Best Film Music) and the Grammy Award (Best Instrumental Composition Written for a Motion Picture or for Television).

Track listing 
 The English Patient 3:30
 A Retreat 1:21
 Rupert Bear 1:22
 What Else Do You Love? 1:00
 Why Picton? 1:04
 Cheek To Cheek 3:15
 Kip's Lights 1:24
 Hana's Curse 2:06
 I'll Always Go Back To That Church 1:48
 Black Nights 1:53
 Swoon, I'll Catch You 1:47
 Am I K. In Your Book? 0:55
 Let Me Come In! 2:35
 Wang Wang Blues 2:47
 Conventino Di Sant' Anna 9:09
 Herodotus 1:04
 Szerelem, szerelem 4:32
 Ask Your Saint Who He's Killed 1:04
 One O'Clock Jump 3:10
 I'll Be Back 4:00
 Let Me Tell You About Winds 0:55
 Read Me To Sleep 4:56
 The Cave Of Swimmers 1:55
 Where Or When 2:14
 Aria From The Goldberg Variations 2:57
 Cheek To Cheek 3:42
 As Far As Florence 5:16
 Én csak azt csodálom (Lullaby For Katharine) 1:07
Total Time: 72:48

Certifications

References

Drama film soundtracks
1996 soundtrack albums
Fantasy Records soundtracks
Gabriel Yared albums
Scores that won the Best Original Score Academy Award